Edwin Hills Hazelton (16 December 1861 – 25 July 1916) was an English first-class cricketer. He represented Hampshire in three first-class matches in 1883. He made his debut against Sussex, where he made a score of 50 exactly, thus registering his only first-class half century and his highest first-class score on debut. Hazelton played two further matches against Surrey and Somerset.

Hazelton died in Simla in the British Raj on 25 July 1916.

External links
Henry Kay at Cricinfo
Henry Kay at CricketArchive

1861 births
1916 deaths
Cricketers from Southampton
English cricketers
Hampshire cricketers